Mozhary (Mojarı) is a rural locality (a selo) in Arlansky Selsoviet, Krasnokamsky District, Bashkortostan, Russia. The population was 393 as of 2010. There are 6 streets.

Geography 
Mozhary is located 23 km south of Nikolo-Beryozovka (the district's administrative centre) by road. Arlan is the nearest rural locality.

References 

Rural localities in Krasnokamsky District